Phil Fox (born August 17, 1985) was an American professional ice hockey player. He is currently playing with the Allen Americans of the Central Hockey League (CHL).

Fox played four years (2007-2011) of NCAA college hockey with the Northern Michigan Wildcats men's ice hockey team.

On February 22, 2013, after nearly two seasons in the CHL, Fox made his American Hockey League debut playing with the Houston Aeros.

Fox left the Brahmas after his two seasons to join CHL rival the Allen Americans on June 27, 2013.

In 2019, Fox became the new Head Coach for the New Mexico Ice Wolves.

References

External links

1985 births
Living people
Allen Americans players
Cedar Rapids RoughRiders players
Des Moines Buccaneers players
Fort Worth Brahmas players
Houston Aeros (1994–2013) players
Northern Michigan Wildcats men's ice hockey players
American men's ice hockey forwards